Arun Mathew (born 27 February 1985), better known by his stage name Mathukkutty, is an Indian radio jockey, television host, actor and director. He is known for his association with the Malayalam television shows on One TV, Mazhavil Manorama, Flowers, Zee Keralam , Surya TV and for his role in the Malayalam film Ithihasa, Campus Diary, Kamuki and Hridayam. His debut film as director was Kunjeldho.

Early life 
Arun Mathew (Mathukutty) was born on 27 February 1985. He was raised in West Vengola, Perumbavoor, Ernakulam to Mathukutty and Sosamma. He completed his bachelor's degree in Malayalam from the Union Christian College, Aluva in 2006. He joined Kerala Press academy in Kakkanad for a Postgraduate Diploma in Journalism. He started his career as editor trainee at Malayalam newspaper Veekshanam. He came to radio as a hobby and ended up as a radio host.

Career

Radio
RJ Mathukkutty started his career as a radio jockey on Red FM in 2007. He was working in Red FM, Trivandrum as a Radio Jockey and program producer for the shows. He was well known during his RJ career for presenting "Love On Air" and "Red Carpet". Later on, in 2017, after completing 9 years in radio, he left Red FM and joined Gold FM as Celebrity interviewer till late 2017.

Television
R J Mathukkutty debuted in television as celebrity interviewer in Surya TV.Later proceeded as anchor for 'Kutty Kalavara' , a cookery show for children on Flowers TV in 2015. He became quite popular after co hosting 'Dhe Chef' , a cookery based reality show aired on Mazhavil Manorama in 2016 in mazhavil manorama. He was the co anchor of 'Udan Panam Season 1', an outdoor Game show which is being aired on Mazhavil Manorama Currently he was the co anchor of "Udanpanam Season 2" and also the co host of "Europil Parann Parann Parann"- A Travelogue based on European Countries, both with "Raj Kalesh".

Feature films
R J Mathukkutty debuted in Malayalam films  as the dialogue writer for the movie You Too Brutus, in 2015. The film and the catchy dialogues in the movie both were widely accepted by the crowd. He has also done guest roles in various Malayalam movies including "Ithihasa" "Kamuki". He has done a notable role in 2016 Malayalam movie Campus Diary directed by Jeevan Das. He had his directorial debut with the movie Kunjeldho in 2021 which was also written by him.

Short films
Mathukkutty has played the lead roles in Malayalam short films named "Kuliscene" directed by Rahul K Shaji in 2013 and "Bedroom" in 2015 directed by Sanjay Markose. He has also made a guest appearance in "Kozhibiriyani" in 2013. Later in 2017, he also played the leading role in the short film "Sorry" directed by Benjith Baby which attained wide viewer acceptance. He also appeared as a cameo in Mattoru Kadavil, sequel of Kuliscene Shortfilm

Awards
 Radio Active Bright Bulb Award for Red Carpet (2013) 
 Radio Active Best Cupid Show Award for Love on Air (2013)
 Flash on Media Best RJ of the Year  Award (2012)
 Media Awards Popular Anchor for Udanpanam (2019)

Filmography

Short films

Web series

Feature films

As dubbing artist

As dialogue writer

Television

References 

9

1985 births
Living people
Indian bloggers
Male actors in Malayalam cinema
Indian male film actors
Indian radio presenters
Indian male voice actors
Male actors from Kochi
21st-century Indian male actors
Male bloggers
. https://instagram.com/rjmathukkutty?igshid=YmMyMTA2M2Y=